is a Japanese actor and voice actor, widely known to international audiences for his work in the tokusatsu genre of television series, usually portraying villainous characters.

Biography

Hirose was born in Tokyo. A gymnast in high-school, Hirose wanted to be an actor while putting his physical talents to use. Upon graduation, he joined the Toei Action Club, finding himself in various guest roles. In 1986, he auditioned for the role of Jin/Red Flash in Choushinsei Flashman, instead being cast as the villain Wanda and proved to be highly popular. In 1987, he auditioned for the role of Kotaro Minami in Kamen Rider Black. Wanting a younger unknown, they instead gave Hirose a guest role earlier in the series. By the time he was cast as the villain Dr. Kemp in 1988's Choujuu Sentai Liveman, his popularity for playing villainous roles increased.

Hirose became a favorite of writer Toshiki Inoue, who wrote him specifically his roles in Choujin Sentai Jetman, Gosei Sentai Dairanger, Choukou Senshi Changéríon and Kamen Rider Agito. Hirose also had guest appearances in tokusatsu shows on Tokkyuu Shirei Solbrain, while working, on the other hand, in films, stage plays and other television guest roles. Always admiring his Flashman and Liveman costar Jouji Nakata, who later found immense popularity in voice acting, he made his voice performance debut as Lian in Brave Command Dagwon.

Still proving to be very popular with tokusatsu fans to this day. He has currently put acting on hold to focus on representing and managing a talent division agency.

Roles

Tokusatsu Credits

Choudenshi Bioman (1984, episode 5) - Thug
Dengeki Sentai Changeman (1985, episodes 4 & 45) - Dog Human / Army Officer 
Kyojuu Tokusou Juspion (1985, episode 14) - Groom
Choushinsei Flashman (1986-1987) - Ley Wanda / Wandara (voice)
Kamen Rider Black (1987, episode 4) - Hayami
Choujuu Sentai Liveman (1988-1989) - Kenji Tsukigata / Dr. Kemp / Beauty Beast Kemp / Fear Beast Kemp / Fear Beast Zuno (voice)
Tokkei Winspector (1990, episode 30) - Masao Murano
Choujin Sentai Jetman (1991-1992, episodes 37 to 47) - Emperor Tranza
Tokkyuu Shirei Solbrain (1991, episode 33) - Kousuke Doi
Gosei Sentai Dairanger (1993-1994) - Jin Matoba / Demon-Fist Master Jin
Choukou Senshi Changéríon (1996) - Kazuki Katayama / General Zander
Kamen Rider Agito (2002, episodes 49 & 50) - Shirakawa

Voice Acting
Brave Command Dagwon (1997) - Space Swordsman Lian

Movies
Shin Gokudou no Tsumatachi
Choushinsei Flashman (1986, film version) - Ley Wanda
Bakusou Trucker Gundan (series)
Doreijuu

Trivia

As a gymnast and member of the Toei Action Club, he often does most of his own stunts.
Specializes in stunts and sword battle.
Directed the action sequences for the sequels to the Bakusou Trucker Gundan movies.

References

Japanese male actors
Living people
1962 births